Bogunović is a Serbian surname, a patronymic derived from Bogun Nemanjić,  Bogun, Bogunović are the only known family that "the male line" leads directly descended from noble family Nemanjić. It may refer to:

Miloš Bogunović, Serbian footballer
Milan Bogunović, Serbian footballer
Saša Bogunović, Serbian footballer
Miloš S. Bogunović, Chetnik commander
Branko Bogunović, Chetnik commander.
Nikanor Bogunović (fl. 1778–83), Serbian Orthodox bishop in Dalmatia.
Vladimir Bogunović, Serbian academic.
Goran Bogunović, Croatian handballer

Anthropology
The patronymic de Bogun is mentioned in the Republic of Ragusa in the period of 1383–1403; a family of Cattaro (Kotor) is mentioned (Andruschus Lauriçe de Bogun dictus Nemagna). There was an old Orthodox family of Bogunović in Šibenik, Croatia (1898). There is a large Serb brotherhood called Bogunović with 396 houses and 22 surnames, with the slava of St. John (1925). In Lika, Croatia, there were 79 houses of Bogunović in 8 settlements (1925). There were Bogunović families in the city of Drvar, and villages of Bastasi and Šipovljani, in western Bosnia and Herzegovina (BiH), recorded in 1948. A Bogunović family in Vogošća, BiH, hailed from Bosanska Dubica, BiH (1967). A Bogunović family lived in Banatsko Karađorđevo, Serbia (1968). People with the surname live in Belgrade.

See also
Bogutović, surname

References

Serbian surnames